Chacenay is a commune in the Aube department in north-central France.

Population

Sights
 The Château de Chacenay is a castle begun in the 13th century.

See also
 Communes of the Aube department

References

Communes of Aube
Aube communes articles needing translation from French Wikipedia